Poix may refer to:

People
 Duke of Poix
 Gabriel Poix (1888–1946), French rower
 Vincent P. de Poix (1916–2015), American vice admiral

Places
 Poix, Marne, France
 Poix-Terron, France
 Poix-de-Picardie, France
 Poix-du-Nord, France
 Saint-Poix, France